Zachary "Zach" Higgins (born December 30, 1990) is a Canadian professional lacrosse player for the Philadelphia Wings of the National Lacrosse League and the Brooklin Redmen of Major Series Lacrosse. Hailing from Courtice, Ontario, Higgins began his Canadian amateur career with the Jr. B Clarington Green Gaels, where he won his league's Goaltender of the Year Award in 2007 and 2008. He moved up to the Jr. A Whitby Warriors, where he won a Minto Cup as the team's starter in 2011. He made his MSL debut with the Redmen in 2012. Higgins attended Courtice Secondary School, and went on to play lacrosse at Davenport University, where he was a two-time first team all-CCLA award winner.

Undrafted in the NLL, Higgins was signed by the Minnesota Swarm in 2012, and spent most of the 2013 season with the Durham TurfDogs, while remaining on Minnesota's practice squad. Although he was signed to the club's active roster on March 12, 2012, Higgins did not see any playing time. He was signed to a three-year contract extension after the season, made his first NLL appearance against the Philadelphia Wings on January 18, 2014, and made his first start on February 1, 2014, against the Colorado Mammoth.

Heading into the 2023 NLL season, Inside Lacrosse named Higgins the #4 best goalie in the NLL.

References

External links
 NLL stats at pointstreak.com
 MSL stats at pointstreak.com
 MCLS stats at mcla.us
 Minnesota Swarm bio

Living people
1990 births
Sportspeople from Clarington
Lacrosse people from Ontario
Davenport University alumni
Minnesota Swarm players
Georgia Swarm players
21st-century Canadian people